Sinoxylon anale is a species of horned powder-post beetle in the family Bostrichidae. It is found in Australia, North America, Southern Asia, and Europe.

References

Further reading

External links

 

Bostrichidae
Articles created by Qbugbot
Beetles described in 1897